The 1846 United States House of Representatives election in Florida was held on Monday, October 5, 1846 to elect the single United States Representative from the state of Florida, one from the state's single at-large congressional district, to represent Florida in the 30th Congress. The election coincided with the elections of other offices, including various state and local elections. The party primaries were held on June 20, 1846.

The winning candidate would serve a two-year term in the United States House of Representatives from March 4, 1847, to March 4, 1849.

Background
In the 1845 congressional election, David Levy Yulee, a Democrat, was elected to the United States House of Representatives. However, Yulee was jointly elected by the Florida Legislature to the United States Senate, and so resigned from the House of Representatives before taking his seat in order to take his seat in the Senate.

A special election was held later in 1845, which saw the election of Edward Carrington Cabell, a Whig. However, his opponent, William Henry Brockenbrough, a Democrat, successfully challenged the results of the election and was seated in the House on January 24, 1846.

Candidates

Democratic

Nominee 

 William A. Kain, state senator

Eliminated at party convention 

 William Henry Brockenbrough, incumbent U.S. representative
 Isaac H. Bronson, former U.S. representative for New York's 18th congressional district
 Chandler C. Younge, lawyer

Whig

Nominee 

 Edward Carrington Cabell, former U.S. representative for Florida's at-large congressional district

General election

Results

Results by County

See also
United States House of Representatives elections, 1846

References

1846
Florida
United States House of Representatives